Raathriyile Yaathrakkaar is a 1976 Indian Malayalam film, directed by P. Venu and produced by Aswathy Suku. The film stars Jayabharathi, Adoor Bhasi, Sreelatha Namboothiri and Bahadoor in the lead roles. The film has musical score by G. Devarajan.

Cast

Jayabharathi 
Adoor Bhasi 
Sreelatha Namboothiri 
Bahadoor 
K. P. Ummer 
Sadhana 
Vincent

Soundtrack 
The music was composed by G. Devarajan and the lyrics were written by Sreekumaran Thampi.

References

External links
 

1976 films
1970s Malayalam-language films
Films directed by P. Venu